Mirza Hasanbegović (born 19 July 2001) is a professional footballer who plays as a forward for Slovenian PrvaLiga club Domžale. Born in Sweden, he represented Bosnia and Herzegovina at youth international level.

Career
Before the second half of the 2019–20 season, Hasanbegović signed for Bulgarian side Lokomotiv Plovdiv, where he made one league appearance.

In 2021, Hasanbegović was sent on loan to Gorica in the Slovenian second division from Italian Serie A club Venezia. On 7 January 2022, he moved on loan to the Greek club Kallithea.

References

2001 births
Living people
Footballers from Stockholm
Association football forwards
Swedish people of Bosnia and Herzegovina descent
Citizens of Bosnia and Herzegovina through descent
Bosnia and Herzegovina footballers
Bosnia and Herzegovina youth international footballers
Bosnia and Herzegovina under-21 international footballers
PFC Lokomotiv Plovdiv players
Venezia F.C. players
ND Gorica players
Kallithea F.C. players
NK Domžale players
First Professional Football League (Bulgaria) players
Slovenian Second League players
Super League Greece 2 players

Bosnia and Herzegovina expatriate footballers
Expatriate footballers in Bulgaria
Bosnia and Herzegovina expatriate sportspeople in Bulgaria
Expatriate footballers in Italy
Bosnia and Herzegovina expatriate sportspeople in Italy
Expatriate footballers in Slovenia
Bosnia and Herzegovina expatriate sportspeople in Slovenia
Expatriate footballers in Greece
Bosnia and Herzegovina expatriate sportspeople in Greece